The women's 200 metre breaststroke event at the 2014 Commonwealth Games as part of the swimming programme took place on 26 July at the Tollcross International Swimming Centre in Glasgow, Scotland.

The medals were presented by Bruce Robertson, Vice-President of the Commonwealth Games Federation and the quaichs were presented by Maureen Campbell, Director of Commonwealth Games Scotland and Chair of Scottish Swimming.

Records
Prior to this competition, the existing world and Commonwealth Games records were as follows.

Results

Heats

Final

References

External links

Women's 200 metre breaststroke
Commonwealth Games
2014 in women's swimming